Sułkowice railway station is a railway station at Sułkowice, Grójec, Masovian, Poland. It is served by Koleje Mazowieckie.

References
Station article at kolej.one.pl

Railway stations in Warsaw